Massimo Girotti (18 May 1918 – 5 January 2003) was an Italian film actor whose career spanned seven decades.

Born in Mogliano, in the province of Macerata, Girotti developed his athletic physique by swimming and playing polo. While studying engineering, he attracted the attention of Mario Soldati, who offered him a small part in the film Dora Nelson (1939), but it was not until later, in Alessandro Blasetti's La corona di ferro (The Iron Crown) (1941) and Roberto Rossellini's Un Pilota ritorna (A Pilot Returns) (1942), that he began to make an impression as a serious actor. In 1943 came a turning point in his career when Luchino Visconti cast him opposite the torrid Clara Calamai in Ossessione (Obsession), an earlier adaptation of the same novel on which Hollywood's The Postman Always Rings Twice is based. The film marked, in a sense, the birth of Italian neo-realism. Some of his notable post-war films include Caccia tragica (The Tragic Hunt) (1946) by Giuseppe De Santis and In nome della legge (1949) (In the Name of the Law) by Pietro Germi.

In 1950, he starred opposite Lucia Bosé in Michelangelo Antonioni's first full-length feature, Cronaca di un amore (Story of a Love Affair) (1950). In 1953, he played Spartacus in an Italian epic film known in the US as Sins of Rome and then, returned to work again for Visconti, in Senso (1954), giving perhaps the finest performance of his career. In the years which followed, he appeared in many mainly Italian films for directors such as Lizzani, Bolognini, Vittorio Cottafavi, Lattuada, but it was not until 1968 that he once again played a role worthy of his talents - that of the father in Pasolini's Teorema (Theorem) with Terence Stamp and Silvana Mangano. Two years later, Pasolini cast him as Creonte opposite Maria Callas in his Medea (1969). In 1972, he was in Bernardo Bertolucci's Last Tango in Paris. That same year he made a rare appearance in a horror film when he agreed to a supporting role in Baron Blood as a favor to its director Mario Bava.

He continued to act in character roles for the next thirty years. Some of the films he appeared in have been notable, including Joseph Losey's Monsieur Klein (1976) with Alain Delon and Jeanne Moreau, the 1985 television miniseries Quo Vadis?, Roberto Benigni's Il mostro (The Monster) (1994).

He died in Rome of a heart attack after having just completed his last film, Ferzan Özpetek's La Finestra di fronte (Facing Windows) (2003).

Selected filmography 

Dora Nelson (1939) .... Enrico
 A Romantic Adventure (1940) .... Luciano
Tosca (1941) .... Angeloti (uncredited)
La corona di ferro (The Iron Crown, 1941) .... Licinio & Arminio, suo figlio
Pirates of Malaya (1941) .... Tremal-Naik
 The Two Tigers (1941) .... Tremal-Naik
The Brambilla Family Go on Holiday (1941) .... Marco Sassoli
Un Pilota ritorna (A Pilot Returns, 1942) .... Il tenente Gino Rossati
 Harlem (1943) .... Tommaso Rossi
Ossessione (Obsession) (1943) .... Gino Costa
Apparizione (1943) .... Franco
The Gates of Heaven (1945) .... Il giovane cieco
The Ten Commandments (1945) .... (segment "Ricordati di santificare le feste")
La carne e l'anima (1945) .... Andrea
Un giorno nella vita (1946) .... Luigi Monotti
 Desire (1946) .... Nando Mancini
Fatalità (1947) .... Vincenzo Masi
Caccia tragica (Tragic Hunt 1947) .... Michele
Shamed (1947) .... Rocco
Christmas at Camp 119 (1947) .... Nane, il veneziano
Lost Youth (1948) .... Marcello Mariani
Difficult Years (1948) .... Giovanni
The Street Has Many Dreams (1948) .... Paolo Bertoni
In nome della legge (In the Name of the Law, 1949) .... Il pretore Guido Schiavi
Fabiola (1949) .... Sebastian
 Altura (1949) .... Stanis Archena
Welcome, Reverend! (1950)
Cronaca di un amore (Story of a Love Affair, 1950) .... Guido
Land der Sehnsucht (1950)
Behind Closed Shutters (1951) .... Ingegnere Roberto
Fugitive in Trieste (1951) .... Il falso giornalista
Duello senza onore (1951) .... Carlo
Rome 11:00 (1952) .... Nando
Leathernose (1952) .... Le docteur Marchal
Il segreto delle tre punte (1952) .... Massimo Del Colle
 Lieutenant Giorgio (1952) .... Tenente G. Biserta
Sins of Rome (Spartaco, 1953) .... Spartacus
At the Edge of the City (1953) .... Avv. Roberto Martini
Sul ponte dei sospiri (1953) .... Marco Spada
A Husband for Anna (1953) .... Andrea Grazzi
Torna! (1953) .... Dott. Guido Aureli
The Love of a Woman (1953) .... André Lorenzi
Senso (1954) .... Il marchese Roberto Ussoni
La tua donna (1954) .... Sandro Ademari
Marguerite de la nuit (1955) .... Valentin
I quattro del getto tonante (1955) .... Maggiore Montanari
Desperate Farewell (1955) .... Dott. Andrea Pitti
Dimentica il mio passato (1957) .... Carlos
Saranno uomini (1957) .... Don Antonio
Souvenir d'Italie (1957) .... Ugo Parenti
La Bestia humana (1957) .... Pedro Sandoval
The Goddess of Love (1957) .... Prassitele
La trovatella di Pompei (1957) .... Guglielmo Curti
The Road a Year Long (1958) .... Chiacchiera (Naklapalo)
Herod the Great (1959) .... Ottaviano / Augustus
Asphalte (1959) .... Éric
Head of a Tyrant (1959) .... Holophernes
Wolves of the Deep (1959) .... Comandante
La cento chilometri (1959) .... Toccaceli
Le notti dei Teddy Boys (1959) .... Constantinos Vater
The Cossacks (1960) .... Tsar Alexander II
Lettere di una novizia (1960) .... Don Paolo Conti
 (1960) .... Orfeo
Cavalcata selvaggia (1960)
Romolo e Remo (1961) .... Re Tazio
Venere Imperiale (1962) .... Leclerc
Mafia alla sbarra (1963)
 (1963) .... Pro-Consul Caius Cornelius Maximus
Marco the Magnificent (1965) .... Nicolo, Marco's Father
Idoli controluce (1965) .... Ugo Sanfelice
El misterioso señor Van Eyck (1966)
La volpe e le camelie (1966)
The Witches (1967) .... Sportsman (segment "Strega Bruciata Viva, La")
Teorema (1968) .... Paolo, the father
Listen, Let's Make Love (1968) .... Tassi
Le sorelle (1969) .... Alex / Martha's husband
The Red Tent (1969) .... Romagna
Medea (1969) .... King Kresus / Creonte
Baron Blood (1972) .... Dr. Karl Hummel
Last Tango in Paris (1972) .... Marcel
Il mio corpo con rabbia (1972) .... Gabriele
Les voraces (1973) .... Olmi
Stateline Motel (1973) .... Fred Norton
La coppia (1973)
The Kiss of Death (1974) .... Eugenio Dazzi
Cagliostro (1975) .... Giacomo Casanova
The Suspicious Death of a Minor (1975) .... Gaudenzio Pesce
Mark Shoots First (1975) .... Il Questore Spaini
The Innocent (1976) .... Count Stefano Egano
Monsieur Klein (1976) .... Charles
And Agnes Chose to Die (1976) .... Palita
Passion of Love (1981) .... Colonel
Art of Love (1983) .... Ovid
Quo Vadis (1985, TV Mini-Series) .... Aulus Plautius
The Berlin Affair (1985) .... Werner Von Heiden
La Bohème (1988) .... Con la partecipazione di
Rebus (1989) .... Conte Valery Du Terrail
La Révolution française (1989) .... L'envoyé du Pape (segment "Anées Lumière, Les")
Dall'altra parte del mondo (1992) .... Aureliano
L'amore dopo (1993) .... Ing. Staino
Il mostro (The Monster, 1994) .... Distinguished Resident
Un bel dì vedremo (1997) .... Emilio Venditti
Dionysios Solomos (2001)
La finestra di fronte (Facing Windows, 2003) .... Simone / Davide Veroli (final film role)

References

External links

1918 births
2003 deaths
People from the Province of Macerata
Italian male film actors
David di Donatello winners
Nastro d'Argento winners
Italian male water polo players
20th-century Italian male actors
21st-century Italian male actors